FK Srem is a football club based in Sremska Mitrovica, Vojvodina, Serbia. They compete in the Sremska Mitrovica City League, the seventh tier of the national league system.

History
The club was founded as Građanski in 1919. They initially competed within the Belgrade Football Subassociation. After the reorganization of the Yugoslav football league system, the club joined the Novi Sad Football Subassociation.

Following the conclusion of World War II, the club was restored and competed as Srem in the 1946 Serbian League North. They reached the reformed Yugoslav Second League in 1958. Over the next eight seasons, the club participated in Group East, before suffering relegation in 1966. They subsequently won the Serbian League North in 1967 and took promotion back to the second tier of Yugoslav football. The club spent one season in Group East and one in Group North, before suffering relegation to the Vojvodina League in 1969.

In 1971, the club placed first in the Vojvodina League and earned promotion to the Yugoslav Second League. They, however, finished bottom of the table in the 1971–72 season and were promptly relegated back to the third tier. The club played 14 consecutive seasons in the Vojvodina League until 1986.

After the breakup of Yugoslavia in 1992, the club competed in the Serbian League North for three seasons, before being allocated to the newly formed Serbian League Vojvodina in 1995. They spent seven more consecutive seasons in the third tier of FR Yugoslavia football.

In the summer of 2002, after suffering relegation to the fourth tier, the club merged with Zvezdara, taking its spot in the Second League of FR Yugoslavia. They remained in the second tier for the next 10 seasons, before suffering relegation to the Serbian League Vojvodina in 2012.

Honours
Serbian League North / Vojvodina League (Tier 3)
 1966–67 / 1970–71

Seasons

Notable players
This is a list of players who have played at full international level.

  Đorđe Kamber
  Luis López
  Thapelo Tale
  Darko Božović
  Dejan Damjanović
  Filip Kasalica
  Igor Đurić
  Milan Lukač
  Branislav Ivanović
  Dragan Vukmir
  Saša Zorić
  Vincent Kayizzi
  Joseph Kizito
  Phillip Ssozi
  Miodrag Kustudić
  Dragan Mutibarić
  Dobrivoje Trivić

For a list of all FK Srem players with a Wikipedia article, see :Category:FK Srem players.

Managerial history

References

External links

 Club page at Srbijasport

 
1919 establishments in Serbia
Association football clubs established in 1919
Football clubs in Yugoslavia
Football clubs in Serbia
Football clubs in Vojvodina
Sremska Mitrovica